Francisco Sierra may refer to:
 Francisco Sierra (boxer), Mexican boxer
 Francisco Sierra (artist), contemporary artist
 Francisco Pérez Sierra, Neapolitan painter